Llacuna is a Barcelona Metro station in the Poblenou neighbourhood of Barcelona, in the Sant Martí district, located under Carrer de Pujades between Carrer de Granada and Carrer de Roc Boronat. It's served by L4 (yellow line).

Services

See also
List of Barcelona Metro stations

External links

Trenscat.com

Railway stations in Spain opened in 1977
El Poblenou
Barcelona Metro line 4 stations